Sebastián 'Sebas' Coris Cardeñosa (born 31 May 1993) is a Spanish professional footballer who plays for Extremadura UD. Mainly a right winger, he can also play as a right back.

Club career
Born in Tossa de Mar, Girona, Catalonia, Coris began his career on hometown's club UE Tossa. After two years with local CF Lloret, he finished his formation in 2012 at Girona FC.

Coris made his senior debuts with the reserves in the regional leagues, in the 2012–13 campaign. On 17 December 2013, he played his first match as a professional, coming on as a late substitute in a Copa del Rey 1–4 loss at Getafe CF.

On 14 August 2014, Coris renewed his link with the club, running until 2016. He made his Segunda División debut on 6 September, again from the bench in a 2–0 home win against CD Tenerife.

On 22 November 2014, Coris further extended his contract, signing until 2018 and being awarded a place with the first team in the following campaign. He scored his first professional goal on 5 February 2017, netting the first in a 2–1 home win against Real Valladolid.

Coris contributed with 27 appearances during the 2016–17 campaign, as his side achieved promotion to La Liga for the first time ever. On 30 June 2017, he was loaned to CA Osasuna, freshly relegated to the second tier, on a one-year deal.

On 10 August 2018, Coris was loaned to Gimnàstic de Tarragona in the second division, for the season. On January 31, 2020 Real Oviedo signed Coris, who previously terminated his contract with Girona. On February 6 he was officially presented as a Real Oviedo player signing the contract until June 30, 2020. Returning to Girona for 2019–20, he failed to make a league appearance before cutting ties with the club on 31 January 2020; just hours later, he agreed to a short-term deal with Real Oviedo.

In October 2020, Coris moved to Extremadura UD on a deal until June 2022.

Career statistics

Club

References

External links

1993 births
Living people
People from Selva
Sportspeople from the Province of Girona
Spanish footballers
Footballers from Catalonia
Association football defenders
Association football wingers
Segunda División players
Divisiones Regionales de Fútbol players
Girona FC B players
Girona FC players
CA Osasuna players
Gimnàstic de Tarragona footballers
Real Oviedo players
Extremadura UD footballers